Parq Vancouver is a mixed-use development located adjacent to BC Place in Vancouver, British Columbia.

The two-floor casino at Parq Vancouver has 600 slot machines and 75 gaming tables, the same as at the former Edgewater Casino, which was located across the street at the Plaza of Nations. The Parq casino opened on September 29, 2017, the same day the Edgewater closed.

References

External links 
 
 JW Marriott Parq Vancouver
 The Douglas

Hotels in Vancouver
JW Marriott Hotels
Autograph Collection Hotels
Casinos in British Columbia